Peter Napolitano (born February 23, 1945) better known by stage name Produce Pete (sometimes referred to as Pete Your Produce Pal), is an American grocer, chef, and celebrity spokesperson who is perhaps best known for his weekly fruit and vegetable segments that appear on WNBC in New York City and WCAU in Philadelphia.
Napolitano had appeared in commercials and at special events for the now defunct A&P-owned supermarket chain Pathmark since 2001, although he never appeared in Pathmark's post-2010 bankruptcy ad campaign.

Early life and family business

Napolitano was born into an Italian-American family in Englewood, New Jersey. In 1953, as a young boy he began selling fruits and vegetables at the neighborhood farmer's market which was owned by his family.

In 1970 Napolitano took ownership of the business and ran it as a seasonal operation, often selling items beyond his line of produce, geared towards upcoming holidays and celebrations. In 1997 he turned the business over to his son, Peter Charles Napolitano. Napolitano Produce closed in 2006 after serving the Bergen County, New Jersey community for 53 years.

Pete met his wife, Bette, when he was 16 years old and she was 14. In 1967 they married. Pete and Bette have 2 children  and seven grandchildren. Bette frequently makes appearances on Produce Pete segments.

Career

Napolitano has hosted numerous produce, food, and nutrition-themed television segments since the late 1980s. The author of Produce Pete's Farmacopeia: From Apples to Zucchini, and Everything in Between (1994, republished in 2001), he has published numerous recipes and tips pertaining to picking, buying, and cooking produce. In 2000, he also worked as a buyer for S. Katzman Produce at the Hunts Point Market in the Bronx, New York. He has also taught cooking classes for Macy's and Bloomingdale's, among other chains.

He has been a resident of North Haledon N.J.

In popular culture
Napolitano's television segments have been parodied by actor and comedian Steve Carell on The Daily Show with Jon Stewart.

References

1940s births
Living people
American businesspeople in retailing
American food writers
American grocers
American people of Italian descent
American television chefs
American male chefs
Macy's, Inc.
NBC News
Mass media in New York (state)
Mass media in Pennsylvania
People from Bergenfield, New Jersey
People from Oakland, New Jersey
The Great Atlantic & Pacific Tea Company